Andrey Pestryayev (born 5 December 1969) is a Russian boxer. He competed in the men's welterweight event at the 1992 Summer Olympics.

References

External links
 

1969 births
Living people
Russian male boxers
Olympic boxers of the Unified Team
Boxers at the 1992 Summer Olympics
People from Sterlitamak
Welterweight boxers
Sportspeople from Bashkortostan